The Franklin Sedan was manufactured by the H. H. Franklin Manufacturing Company Company of Syracuse, New York.

Franklin Sedan specifications (1926 data) 

 Color – Several
 Seating Capacity – Five
 Wheelbase – 119 inches
 Wheels - Wood
 Tires - 21” x 5.25” balloon
 Service Brakes – transmission type
 Emergency Brakes – contracting on rear wheels
 Engine  - Six cylinder, vertical, cast en block, 3-1/4 x 4 inches; head removable; valves in head; H.P. 25.3, S.A.E. formula
 Lubrication – Separate force feed
 Crankshaft - Seven bearing
 Cooling – Air
 Ignition –Storage battery
 Starting System – Two Unit
 Voltage – Six
 Wiring System – Single
 Gasoline System – Vacuum
 Clutch – Dry plate
 Transmission – Selective sliding
 Gear Changes – 3 forward, 1 reverse
 Drive – Spiral bevel
 Rear Springs – Full elliptic
 Rear Axle – Semi-floating
 Steering Gear – Worm and gear

Standard equipment
New car price included the following items:
 automatic windshield wiper
 Watson stabilizers
 stop light
 spare tire
 cover
 tire carrier and lock
 bumper front
 bumperettes rear
 mirror
 electric primer
 hand tire pump
 complete set of tools, including Zerk oil gun.

Optional equipment
The following was available at an extra cost:
 None

Prices
New car prices were available F.O.B. Syracuse, New York, on the following models:
 Sedan - $3200
 Touring - $2650
 Sport Sedan - $3350
 Coupé - $2700
 Sport Runabout - $2800
 Enclosed-drive Limousine - $3500
 Cabriolet - $4400

See also
 Franklin (automobile)

References
Source: 

Vintage vehicles
Defunct companies based in Syracuse, New York